The 2012 WK League was the fourth season of the WK League, the top division of women's football in South Korea. The regular season began on 26 March 2012 and ended on 29 October 2012. Goyang Daekyo were the defending champions.

Teams

Table

Results

Matches 1 to 14

Matches 15 to 21

All-Stars Match
 Blue Mir : Chungnam Ilhwa Chunma, Goyang Daekyo Noonnoppi, Jeonbuk KSPO, Suwon Facilities Management Corporation
 Red Mir : Busan Sangmu, Chungbuk Sportstoto, Incheon Hyundai Steel Red Angels, Seoul City Amazones

Playoff and championship
The playoff was played as a single leg and the championship final was played over two legs.

Playoff

Championship final
1st leg

2nd leg

Goyang Daekyo Noonnoppi won 3–2 on aggregate.

References

wkleague.co.kr 

2009
Women
South Korea
South Korea